Lobogonia is a genus of moths in the family Geometridae described by Warren in 1893.

Species
Lobogonia aculeata Wileman, 1911
Lobogonia ambusta Warren, 1893
Lobogonia conspicuaria Leech, 1897
Lobogonia formosana (Bastelberger, 1909)
Lobogonia olivata Warren, 1896
Lobogonia pallida (Warren, 1894)
Lobogonia parallelaria Leech, 1897
Lobogonia pseudomacariata (Poujade, 1895)
Lobogonia salvata Prout, 1928

References

Larentiinae